Annopol may refer to:

Annopol in Lublin Voivodeship (east Poland)
Annopol, Chełm County in Lublin Voivodeship (east Poland)
Annopol, Hrubieszów County in Lublin Voivodeship (east Poland)
Annopol, Lubartów County in Lublin Voivodeship (east Poland)
Annopol, Gostynin County in Masovian Voivodeship (east-central Poland)
Annopol, Grójec County in Masovian Voivodeship (east-central Poland)
Annopol, Przasnysz County in Masovian Voivodeship (east-central Poland)
Annopol, Wołomin County in Masovian Voivodeship (east-central Poland)
Annopol, Kalisz County in Greater Poland Voivodeship (west-central Poland)
Annopol, Rawicz County in Greater Poland Voivodeship (west-central Poland)
Annopol, in Ukraine, also spelled Hannopil (Аннополь, Ганнопіль) in Vinnyts'ka, Khmel'nyts'ka, Kharkivs'ka and Zhytomyr Oblasts

See also
Annopole (disambiguation)